Behram Kurşunoğlu (14 March 1922 – 25 October 2003) was a Turkish physicist and the founder and the director of the Center for Theoretical Studies, University of Miami. He was best known for his works on unified field theory, energy and global issues.

He participated in the discovery of two different types of neutrinos in late 1950s. During his University of Miami career, he hosted several Nobel Prize laureates, including Paul Dirac, Lars Onsager and Robert Hofstadter. He wrote several books on diverse aspects of physics, the most notable of which is Modern Quantum Theory (1962).

Early life and education
Behram Kurşunoğlu was born in Çaykara district of Trabzon. While he was a third year student in the Department of Mathematics and Astronomy of İstanbul Yüksek Öğretmen Okulu, he was sent to University of Edinburgh through a scholarship of the Turkish Ministry of Education, in 1945.

After graduating from the University of Edinburgh, he completed his doctorate degree in physics at the University of Cambridge. During the period of 1956–1958, he served as the dean of the Faculty of Nuclear Sciences and Technology at Middle East Technical University and a counselor to the office of Turkish General Staff. He held teaching positions at several universities in the United States, and starting from 1958, professorship at the University of Miami.

Career

University of Miami
In 1965, he acted as one of the founders of the Center for Theoretical Studies of the University of Miami, of which he became the first director. During this period, he also worked in counseling positions for several research organizations and laboratories in Europe. With the invitation of Russian Academy of Sciences, he worked as a visiting professor in the USSR during 1968.

He continued his work at the Center for Theoretical Studies of the University of Miami until 1992, after which he became the director of the Global Foundation research organization.

Kursunoglu died on October 25, 2003, due to heart attack, shortly before that year's Coral Gables Conference, which was a festschrift for Paul Frampton combined with a memorial for Kursunoglu in a conference series he had been organizing since 1964. He had three children, İsmet, Sevil and Ayda, from his wife Sevda Arif.

Publications 
In Physical Review Letters:

1951 On Einstein's Unified Field Theory
1953 Derivation and Renormalization of the Tamm-Dancoff Equations
1953 Expectations from a Unified Field Theory
1953 Unified Field Theory and Born-Infeld Electrodynamics

In Physical Review:

1952 Gravitation and Electrodynamics
1954 Tamm-Dancoff Methods and Nuclear Forces
1956 Transformation of Relativistic Wave Equations
1957 Proton Bremsstrahlung
1963 Brownian Motion in a Magnetic Field
1964 New Symmetry Group for Elementary Particles. I. Generalization of Lorentz Group Via Electrodynamics
1967 Space-Time and Origin of Internal Symmetries
1968 Dynamical Theory of Hadrons and Leptons

In Physical Review D:

1970 Theory of Relativistic Supermultiplets. I. Baryon SpectroscopyElectrodynamics
1970 Theory of Relativistic Supermultiplets. II. Periodicities in Hadron Spectroscopy
1974 Gravitation and magnetic charge
1975 Erratum: Gravitation and magnetic charge
1976 Consequences of nonlinearity in the generalized theory of gravitation
1976 Velocity of light in generalized theory of gravitation

In Journal of Mathematical Physics:
1961 Complex Orthogonal and Antiorthogonal Representation of Lorentz Group
1967 Unitary Representations of U(2, 2) and Massless Fields
In Reviews of Modern Physics:
1957 Correspondence in the Generalized Theory of Gravitation

Awards
 Fellow of the American Physical Society (1965)
 TÜBİTAK Science Award (1972)
 Award of Phi Kappa Phi honor society
 Award of the Sigma Xi scientific research society
 Sigma Pi Sigma award
 "Science is Guidance" Award of the Atatürk Society of America (2001)

Further reading

References

External links
The Work of Behram Kursunoglu, talk presented at the 2003 Coral Gables conference by Philip D. Mannheim.
La Belle Epoque of High Energy Physics and Cosmology, webpage for the 2003 Coral Gables conference.

People from Çaykara
Turkish emigrants to the United States
Turkish physicists
1922 births
2003 deaths
Alumni of the University of Edinburgh
University of Miami faculty
Academic staff of Middle East Technical University
Fellows of the American Physical Society
Theoretical physicists
Recipients of TÜBİTAK Science Award
Members of the Turkish Academy of Sciences
American academics of Turkish descent
People from Bayburt